Ad Fontes Media, Inc. is a Colorado-based media watchdog organization primarily known for its Media Bias Chart, which rates media sources in terms of political bias and reliability. The organization was founded in 2018 by patent attorney Vanessa Otero with the goal of combating political polarization and media bias. Ad Fontes Media uses a panel of analysts across the political spectrum to evaluate articles for the Chart.

History

Ad Fontes Media has its origins in a blog called All Generalizations are False which was written by patent attorney Vanessa Otero from Denver, Colorado. Otero first published the Media Bias Chart, a graphic which helped viewers visualize media bias in the United States, on the blog. The Media Bias Chart became a viral phenomenon on the Imgur image sharing service in December 2016, and Otero founded Ad Fontes Media to serve as the publisher of the chart. One of Otero's reasons for creating the organization was that "many sources people consider to be 'news sources' are actually dominated by analysis and opinion pieces," and that "extreme sources play on people's worst instincts, like fear and tribalism, and take advantage of people's confirmation biases." In an interview with Newsy, she stated that "If people understood that the sources they are consuming are actively making them angrier and polarizing them, then they might choose to consume less of that."

In 2018, Ad Fontes successfully launched a crowdfunding campaign to improve the technology behind the chart, increase the number of analysts, and make the site's methodology more transparent. As of September 2020, the organization had a team of around twenty, most of whom were independent contractors, working as analysts of various news sources.

Otero chose the name "Ad Fontes" because it is Latin for "to the source"; her method is to go to a media source itself and rate its bias and reliability "by analyzing the source and its actual content."

Media Bias Chart

The Media Bias Chart by Ad Fontes Media rates various media sources on two different scales: political bias (left to right) on the horizontal axis and reliability on the vertical axis. On the chart, sources are concentrated in an "inverted-U" shape as media sources with a neutral bias are generally reliable in their original fact reporting, while sources with an extreme bias on either side often contain factually inaccurate information and propaganda.

Ad Fontes is non-partisan. During the September 2020 media bias project, nearly 1800 individual articles and TV news shows were rated by at least three analysts with different political views (left, right and center). There were 120 analysts, each reviewed about 370 articles and about 17 TV shows. Each analyst rated approximately three articles from each of the over 100 news sources available for viewing on the Chart. As a result, there were nearly 7,000 individual ratings.

Otero sees the Media Bias Chart as an "anchor" that counteracts political polarization in news media, and aspires for Ad Fontes to become a "Consumer Reports for media ratings". She compared low-quality news sources to junk food, and described sources with extreme bias as "very toxic and damaging to the country".

Reception
The chart has been criticized by people on the left and the right. According to Otero, "A lot of people on the left will call us neoliberal shills, and then a bunch of people that are on the right are like, 'Oh, you guys are a bunch of leftists yourselves.'"

In 2018, a Columbia Journalism Review article questioned the thoroughness of the Media Bias Chart and similar initiatives, stating that "the five to 20 stories typically judged on these sites represent but a drop of mainstream news outlets' production".

In 2021, an article on the Association of College and Research Libraries' blog argued that the Media Bias Chart is detrimental to media literacy efforts because it "promotes a false equivalency between left and right, lionizes a political 'center' as being without bias, and reinforces harmful perceptions about what constitutes 'news' in our media ecosystem, and is ignored by anyone that doesn't already hold a comparable view of the media landscape."

News sources that were rated poorly on the Media Bias Chart have been critical of the chart. Alex Jones, the founder of right-wing conspiracy theory site InfoWars, said Ad Fontes' chart represented the "dying dinosaur media's extreme liberal bias" after the chart classified InfoWars as "nonsense damaging to public discourse". InfoWars responded with a chart of their own, putting themselves as "independent" and representing "freedom" while labeling news sources like the Associated Press as "tyranny" and "state-run corporate/foreign influences"; InfoWarss chart was widely criticized by journalists on Twitter.

See also 
 AllSides
 Media Bias/Fact Check
 NewsGuard

References

Criticism of journalism
Fact-checking websites
Media bias controversies
American journalism organizations